Axel Bossekota (born 9 April 1989 in France) is a Belgian footballer who plays for IC Croix from the Championnat National 3.

Career

Bossekota started his senior career with French club Amiens SC. In 2015, he signed for Cercle Brugge K.S.V. in the Belgian First Division B, where he made three appearances and scored zero goals. After that, he played for Belgian clubs Royal Football Club Seraing, RWS Bruxelles, Lebbeke, K.V. Woluwe-Zaventem, and is now playing for Léopold.

References

External links 
 Interview With Axel Bossekota
 Belgian striker looking to make his mark in Limerick
 "En une semaine, d'un contrat de 20.000 pounds au statut de clochard"
 Axel Bossekota : « J’ai été en contact avec l’Union en décembre dernier »
 Axel Bossekota hoopt zich te bewijzen bij KVK Tienen
 at Footballdatabase.eu
 Extratime.ie Profile
 Foot National Profile
 Cercle Brugge KSV Profile
 KVK Tienen Official Website Profile

Association football midfielders
Association football forwards
Association football wingers
Belgian footballers
1989 births
Living people
Belgian expatriate footballers
Expatriate association footballers in the Republic of Ireland
Belgian sportspeople of Democratic Republic of the Congo descent
Expatriate soccer players in Canada
Expatriate footballers in England
Amiens SC players
Expatriate footballers in Cyprus
Expatriate footballers in France
Pafos FC players
K.V.K. Tienen-Hageland players
Cercle Brugge K.S.V. players
AS Verbroedering Geel players
R.F.C. Seraing (1922) players
RWS Bruxelles players
K.V. Woluwe-Zaventem players
Léopold FC players
Oud-Heverlee Leuven players
R.A.E.C. Mons players
S.V. Zulte Waregem players
Limerick F.C. players
Iris Club de Croix players